David Wohl (born September 22, 1953 in Brooklyn, New York City) is an American theater, television and film actor.  He is a long time character actor.

Selected filmography
Terms of Endearment (1983) as Phil
Revenge of the Nerds (1984) as Dean Ulich
Gotcha! (1985) as Professor
Beer (1985) as Stanley Dickler
Turk 182 (1985) as TV producer
D.A.R.Y.L. (1985) as Mr. Nesbit
Brewster's Millions (1985) as Eugene Provost
Badge of the Assassin (1985) as Ken Klein
Armed and Dangerous (1986) as Prosecutor
Like Father Like Son (1987) as Dr. Roger Hartwood
The Couch Trip (1988) as Dr. Smet
Troop Beverly Hills (1989) as Dr. Honigman
The War of the Roses (1989) as Dr. Gordon
Presumed Innocent (1990) as Morrie Dickerman
Hot Shots! Part Deux (1993) as Gerou
Rear Window (1998) as Dr. Schneider
Saving Private Ryan (1998) as Captain T.E. Sanders, Captain at the War Department
The Wackness (2008) as Mr. Shapiro

Television
Family Ties (1986) Episode 81 "The Disciple" as 'Ralph Boswell'
Hey Arnold! (1996–2004) as Principal Wartz and Jerry Berman
 Madam Secretary as Israeli Ambassador Dory

Broadway
 The Man Who Had All the Luck (2002) as Augie Belfast
 Dinner at Eight (2002–2003) as Mr. Fitch
 Fiddler on the Roof (2004–2006) as Lazar Wolf

Regional Theatre
 The Buddy System, Circle in the Square Downtown, New York City, 1981 as Arthur "Gruely" Gruelbacher
 The Man Who Came to Dinner, Cincinnati Playhouse, Cincinnati, OH, 1981
 Northern Lights, Cricket Theatre, Minneapolis, MN, 1981
 Awake and Sing!, Jewish Repertory Theatre, New York City, 1981
 Portrait of Jenny, New Federal Theatre, Harry DeJur Playhouse, New York City, 1982 as Gus
 Luna Park, in Delmore, Jewish Repertory Theatre, 1982 as Harry
 Shenandoah in Delmore, Jewish Repertory Theatre, 1982 as Walter
 Basement Tapes, Top of the Gate, New York City, 1983 as G. Gordon Liddy
 Isn't It Romantic?, Lucille Lortel Theatre, New York City, 1985 as Marty Sterling
 Ghetto, Center Theatre Group, Mark Taper Forum, Los Angeles, 1986
 Down the Garden Paths, George Street Playhouse, New Brunswick, NJ, 1999 as Arthur

References

External links

1953 births
Male actors from New York (state)
American male film actors
American male stage actors
American male television actors
Living people
People from Brooklyn
Jewish American male actors
21st-century American Jews